The 1967 Tour de France started with 130 cyclists, divided into 13 teams of 10 cyclists.

Eight teams were pure national teams:
 France
 Germany
 Belgium
 Spain
 Great Britain
 Italy
 Netherlands
 Switzerland/Luxembourg (combined)
And five teams were additional national teams:
 Red devils (young Belgian cyclists)
 Esperanza (young Spanish cyclists)
 Primavera (young Italian cyclists)
 Bleuets de France (young French cyclists)
 Coqs de France (young French cyclists)

Start list

By team

By rider

By nationality

References

1967 Tour de France
1967